Alain Noury (born 4 November 1945) is a French actor. He appeared in more than twenty films since 1967.

Selected filmography

References

External links 

1945 births
Living people
French male film actors
Male actors from Paris